Told at Twilight is a 1917 American silent drama film directed by Henry King and starring Marie Osborne, Daniel Gilfether, and Beatrice Van.

Cast
 Marie Osborne as Little Mary Sunshine 
 Daniel Gilfether as Daniel Graham 
 Beatrice Van as The Mother 
 Henry King as The Father 
 Leon Pardue as Piggy

References

Bibliography
 Donald W. McCaffrey & Christopher P. Jacobs. Guide to the Silent Years of American Cinema. Greenwood Publishing, 1999.

External links

1917 films
1917 drama films
Silent American drama films
Films directed by Henry King
American silent feature films
1910s English-language films
Pathé Exchange films
American black-and-white films
1910s American films